Angéla Németh (18 February 1946 – 5 August 2014) was a Hungarian track and field athlete, known as Angéla Ránky after her marriage.

In competing for her native country at the 1968 Summer Olympics in Mexico City, Mexico, she won the gold medal in the javelin.

She was named Hungarian Sportswoman of The Year in 1968 and 1969 after having won the Olympic title in 1968 and the European title in 1969.

References 

1946 births
2014 deaths
Athletes from Budapest
Hungarian female javelin throwers
Olympic athletes of Hungary
Olympic gold medalists for Hungary
Athletes (track and field) at the 1968 Summer Olympics
Athletes (track and field) at the 1972 Summer Olympics
Medalists at the 1968 Summer Olympics
European Athletics Championships medalists
Olympic gold medalists in athletics (track and field)